Chodouň is a municipality and village in Beroun District in the Central Bohemian Region of the Czech Republic. It has about 700 inhabitants. It lies on the Litavka river.

References

Villages in the Beroun District